Direksyon is the ninth studio album of the Filipino trio Apo Hiking Society. It's a 10-track album released in 1987 under Universal Records.

Track listing
"Ajaw-Ajaw" (4:12)
"Kung Sino-Sino, Kung Saan-Saan" (4:57)
"Softly" (3:49)
"Minsan sa Buhay" (3:58)
"In My Heart (Alay Kay Ka Stevie W.)" (3:40)
"Getting Better" (3:13)
"Ayoko Sana" (4:23)
"Care" (2:43)
"Tamad" (3:32)
"Sasaya ang Pilipinas" (3:42)

References

External links
The Official Apo Hiking Society Website  

1987 albums
APO Hiking Society albums
Universal Records (Philippines) albums